Taylor Creek is a stream in Hickman County, Tennessee, United States. It is a tributary of Duck River.

Taylor Creek was named for a pioneer named Taylor who was the original owner of land surrounding the creek.

See also
List of rivers of Tennessee

References

Rivers of Hickman County, Tennessee
Rivers of Tennessee